Vincent Bushy Parker(11 February 1918 – 29 January 1946) was an Australian Royal Air Force flying ace, a prisoner of war and a serial escaper. He participated in the Second World War.

Parker's aunt and uncle adopted him at two year old, following the death of his mother. Parker emigrated to Australia with his adoptive parents. In Australia, Bohleville State School educated Parker in the 1930s. After his schooling, Kodak employed the teenage Parker. He also trained as a magician and an escapologist. As a magician he later worked with Leslie George Cole (The Great Lavante). 

In 1938, in Sydney, he obtained a billet as a steward on the ship Ontranto and traveled to Britain. In May 1939 he trained as a fighter pilot at an RAF flying school in the UK. He then participated in the Battle of Britain. The RAF credited Parker with the five aerial victories during the war. And in August 1940, Parker baled out of his damaged Spitefire over Portland after a dog fight. Injuring his shoulder, he baled into the Channel and here, the German Navy captured him. As a prisoner of war, Parker escaping was constant. He escaped from Stalag Luft I and Stalag Luft III. In May 1942, the German prison authority sent Parker to a camp for high security risks called Colditz Castle. 

Post liberation, in January 1946, an aviation accident killed Parker. Comrades in Colditz, Stalag Luft I and Stalag Luft III have described Parker in the literature. Parker was a talented card sharp, and one of the four outstanding lock pickers in the Schloss. The Colditz literature highlights many escape attempts used Parker's lock picking skills. Paying respect to Parker, Townsville City Council named Vincent Bushy Parker park in Rollingstone, Queensland Australia after him.

Early years
Parker was born in Co-operative Street, Chester-le-Street, on 11 February 1918, to Vincent and Lydia Wheatley. He was one of three sons.
Parker's mother died aged 26 and his father was unable to cope with his work load alongside the responsibility of a young child. In 1920, aunt Edith and her husband John Parker adopted Vincent Wheatley. Following the adoption the Parkers changed Vincent's surname and in 1928 the Parkers emigrated to Australia. John found work on the railways and later, Edith found work as the station Mistress at a train station in Purono, North Queensland.

Bohleville State School educated Vincent Parker. Reports suggest Parker had an ability for acrobatics and athletics. On leaving school he moved to Townsville, and worked at Kodak on Flinders Street. At Kodak, a friend recalled Parker somersaulting out of a window. His goal was to catch an invoice caught in the wind. The window had an eight foot drop and his friend described the action as extraordinary. This stunt impressed a department store manager nearby, who offered Parker a job as a showman. His act at the store was confident, bordering on cocky. and later, a travelling magician caught his act and offered him a role as a travelling magician.

Months of performing over Australia took its toll. Tired; Parker moved to Sydney and in 1938, he obtained a billet as a steward on the cruise liner Ontranto. 
Parker also met the magician Leslie George Cole (The Great Lavante). Performing and socialising with Cole, he learned to master various methods of escapology.

Before World War II Parker visited Britain twice. His first visit was brief. On arrival his ship sailed back to Australia. In October 1938, via the Otranto, he returned to Britain. He visited the Wheatleys and stayed until February 1939. He learned his two brothers were fighter pilots. This made a big impression on Parker and he developed the enthusiasm to volunteer. He cabled his parents in Australia and asked for permission to join the RAF... On acceptance, he arranged to borrow money from his parents to pay for the flying school training.

RAF
He first trained at a civilian flying school. His training started in May 1939 and the training required three months of his time. His progression was rapid and he qualified in six weeks. On 22 July 1939, the RAF granted Parker a six-year service commission as a pilot officer on probation. He began his No. 11 Fighter Training School at RAF Shawbury in August 1939 and Parker gained his pilot's badge on 25 October 1939.

On 10 April 1940, the RAF posted Parker to 234 Squadron, RAF Leconfield from 11 FTS.

Second World War

The RAF regarded the Spitfire as expensive and an important resource. In 1940, the RAF circulated a message. They stated that they would accept no casual reason if a pilot damaged a plane. They explained they would transfer the pilot. 

Two weeks after joining the squadron Parker smashed up his plane. Foggy weather disrupted his given flight path on a practice run. Disoriented, he ran out of fuel. Parker landed in a farmers field. Landing; he noted a flock of animals lined up. He adjusted his angles of approach and maneuvered in an appropriate fashion.  He decelerated and taxied on the field; his wheels hit a bump... This flipped his plane. Parker left the plane unscathed and the damage to the plane was slight. 

Parker asserted to the command he took action. He explained, he looked after the farmer's sheep... The RAF accepted his reasoning.

On 14 August 1940, the RAF stationed Parker and his squadron at Middle Wallop field. In this period, the RAF promoted him to pilot officer.

The Few

Parker fought in the Battle of Britain. Part of The Few, listed as a participant, he was a flying ace. Parker repelled at least five bombers in the battle. 
On 15 August, a dogfight over Portland, occupied Parker and his squadron. The radar marked the air invasion as significant. The raid contained 70 Luftwaffe bombers, escorted by 150 fighters... 

Parker took down two Me110 bombers. At 16:15 the Luftwaffe incapacitated his Spitfire. Injuring his shoulder, gliding at 900 feet, he baled near the Isle of Wight. After four hours at sea a German launch captured him, and transported him to Cherbourg. The Luftwaffe soon flew him to Dulag Luft, the temporary holding center for allied airmen. 

Parker was one of four casualties his squadron suffered on this raid. ANZAC comrade, Pilot Officer Cecil Hight lost his life. Pilot Officer Richard Hardy ended up captured in France and joined Parker in Dulag Luft. Sergeant Klein 'Ziggy' Zygmunt, a Pole, survived... Klein crash landed in Twyford.

Character

Exculpable

Objects thrown out of the window were common in 1943. Corran Purdon explained the noise, the jeering, the cheering, a burning palliasse, water bombs... a morale unlike any other camp, and the riot squads, when he entered the Colditz courtyard for the first time.

On 22 June 1943 Eichstätt tunneller Jack Champ arrived at Oflag IV-C (Colditz). Reinhold Eggers and his security staff processed Champ the following day. A protocol required a photograph of Champ with his prison number. In the Schloss, a guard had to chaperone a civilian worker, at all times. Lags goon baited the protocol. 
Three water bombs from the third and fourth floors hit the cobbled floor. Splashes soaked Champ, his comrades and the civilian cameraman... This angered the guard... The guard and the cameraman rushed up the staircase. On the third and fourth floors, they tried to arrest those culpable.

From 1942, following an order, water bombs and objects dropped out of the window, carried an execution threat. No one knows who threw the water. Parker and Tunstall were exculpated and innocent. They walked away from the mischief. They nipped out to greet the ANZAC lads, after the water bombs were thrown... They took the brownie camera, though. They found no safe keeping. 
Eggers suspected theft. Via the command of Eggers, the guards performed a systematic search for the camera. To the civilian's relief, the guards found the object. It was safe, parked on a spare palliasse. 

After this event, Champ introduced himself to the grinning Parker. Champ described Parker as "the most enigmatic of the Australians to set foot in Colditz."

Pat Reid highlighted Parker was a major player in the POW camp. Reid later stated, "Colditz would not have been quite what it was if Bush had not been there, and his activities throw a revealing sidelight upon the life of the prison".

Nickname
In Australia 'Bushy' is the nickname given to characters, who live in the bush away from built up areas. A Townsville lad, a lad from the bush, Parker's nickname back home was 'Bushy'. At 234 Squadron his flight commander was Pat Hughes. Hughes liked to have his say at the Squadron. To Hughes, Mortimer-Rose was 'Morty', Hornby was 'Hornpipe', Owens was 'Bish'. Parker's nickname at 234 Squadron was 'Bush'.

Mechanical innovation
 A lad mechanically talented... Parker was ingenious and full of courage. Parker could pick any lock. Parker was among four outstanding lockbreakers in Colditz. The Frenchman Frédérick Guigues, the Pole Miki Surmanowicz, the Dutchman van Doorninck and Parker were locksmiths with pedigree. In the worst lock picking case, Parker only needed the guard distracted. He could cut keys out of an old bit of metal. He could create keys out of coal shovels, bed iron and coat hooks. 
Sapper Jim Rogers stated, "Our lockpick man for this work was 'Bush Parker'... ...In my view, Bush was one of the great men of Colditz".  To Pete Tunstall, Parker was a great lad... nosey... It was terrible,.. Tunstall stated, "he knew for a fact he had illegal tools'.

Composure
His comrade Donaldson recalled Parker's composure and fast thinking whilst under pressure. He recalled how, one day in their quarters, the guards turned up. They executed a search that caught the prisoners by surprise. The prisoners had towel wrapped tools laying around. The prisoners knew, if the guards found a tool they'd face punishment. Thinking fast, a selfless Parker picked up the tool wrap.  Holding onto the tools, Parker ensured he carried the can... The guards stood them all against the wall... They placed them five feet apart and searched them. Under pressure, Parker assessed the environment and the angles... He contorted enough to hide the tools from view. Donaldson explained the guards saw nothing... Expanding that Parker's calmness and sleight of hand, saved the tools. 
Donaldson was glad to have known Parker during those traumatic years.

Anzac Day

He liked to pay his respects. In March 1944, a mess of ANZACs in Colditz decided to celebrate Anzac Day. They made a calculation... They went without a meal for two nights per week until the 25 April. This ensured they had a basic menu for the invited dignitaries. Parker was a central player in that celebration. Rex Harrison was an old mate. Harrison explained Parker's illegal batch of grog "tasted of cats piss..., it could burn a hole in steel plates...  There would be fewer casualties if water broke it down." Parker, doing well for himself on the black economy, donated his grog for the event. Parker's grog tasted fine on that night.

Card sharp
He was a card sharp. Parker never ripped off his comrades with his skills. Few could beat Parker at cards, especially when he shuffled the pack. He had dexterity, his shuffling was mesmeric, if he wanted, he could rig a pack unseen, and he had a detailed memory.

Royal flush, Bag and Rex
Parker, Dickinson, Harrison, Barton and O'Hara, had a weekly poker night. One night, Dick Howe joined in. Here, Howe, eyeballed the card sharping.... Howe explained that after fifteen minutes of play the game warmed up. At this epoch, Parker nudged Howe. Parker had decided to prank Bag and Rex... 
Dickinson received a good poker hand. A hand that statistically occurs one in four-thousand times... Hence, Parker dealt the fours to Dickinson. Rex Harrison was dealt a hand with a good chance, a hand worth bluffing with. He had a full house. Dick Howe asked for two more cards. In turn, he received a knave, then a ten of hearts. O'Hara and Barton dropped out.  The whole mess watched on. The stakes and bluffs grew out of proportion. The pot soon reached two thousand Lagermarken. 

The tension grew. Dickinson stressed to Harrison 'he should pack it in... ...and stop the bluffing... as his hand is a power house...'. He ignored Dick Howe. Dick Howe sat by, with a poker face, not making a scene. Howe let Dickinson and Harrison inflate the prize. Under pressure, Harrison dropped out. This prompted Dickinson. 
With immediate effect, Dickinson settled with Howe to show their hands. Dickinson assumed he had won the jackpot. Dickinson motioned to pick up his winnings. To Dickinson's disbelief though, Howe's hand was a one in six-hundred-thousand chance — a royal flush. The rare Royal Flush caused excitement in the mess quarters. Howe and Parker had internalised laughter. Dickinson and Harrison were devastated — and skint... Howe and Parker were solemn for the two lads. They commiserated them. 
Later, Howe and Parker handed back the winnings. 

This card sharping impressed Howe. He could not figure out this type of shuffling and sorcery.

Bridge game and Bader
His comrade Bader tried to compete. Champ recalled Bader and Guy German taking on Parker and Mike Wittet at a game of bridge. Bader hated struggling. He was tense, he developed an irritation. Perceptive; Champ noted a suspicious wink and a smirk at Wittet from Parker... After that Parker dealt Bader a good Bridge hand. Bader eased and smiled.  Champ suspected Parker regulated Bader's emotion. Champ could not fathom out if Parker was taking the piss, or being sympathetic. Both actions had an edge when dealing with the Wing Commander Bader. Bader was not the type to accept light hearted mickey taking. Bader also did not appreciate a sympathetic favour. He suspected if Bader had seen the wink he'd have ignored Parker for life.

Parker played a role in almost every escape attempt in Colditz.

Messmates and business

Like his hands and fingers, his wit, was lightning. Parker talked a lot. He was an orator. He carried anecdotes. He carried himself well in front of a crowd. He thrived in the company of his mess mates.
In Colditz, Parker alongside John Patrick 'Bag' Dickinson and Albert van Rood, had business interests. They dealt in prisoner necessities and Red Cross luxury. They handled food staples, chocolate, coal and alcohol. 
Prisoners made and stashed speakeasy alcohol in Colditz from 1941. In 1942, Albert van Rood used anti-cartel laws to open a rival distillery. The literature highlights nuanced interplay between  Parker, Dickinson and the enterprising van Rood.

Van Rood
Parker and his comrades called van Rood, 'Goonstein'. Goonstein was a play on a speakeasy publican from a known story. A RAF fighter pilot like Parker, the Dutchman van Rood studied medicine in the UK before the war. Van Rood spoke four languages... He stamped his authority on every subject. Inside Colditz, he was a chemist, a skillful brewer and a director in a company. The distillery was van Rood's idea and van Rood was the chemist.

Dickinson
Flight Lieutenant John Dickinson, was a bomber pilot in the RAF. Before the war he worked at the engineering firm Rotol Ltd. Dickinson was mischievous. Whereas Parker was an escape committee man, Dickinson was not. Dickinson preferred to lone wolf his escaping. He once exploited loop holes in the civilian cells. He disappeared, then traveled across to Chemnitz, in khaki and RAF blue. He realised he stood out... On his arrest, the police made a swift allegation. They accused Dickinson of stealing a jacket from a hotel lobby. Dickinson had no sartorial elegance. His kit repairs were functional. Taking the mick, Parker and his comrades called Dickinson 'Bag'. 
Mess speakeasy gatherings were occasional events. During these sessions, Dickinson had a habit of going to sleep on his straw palliasse whilst smoking a Red Cross tab. Parker and his comrades made sure there was a water bucket nearby for Dickinson. This was for public safety. The second time he set his palliasse on fire, Dickinson, with dark humor, chastised the lads. They had soaked his only pair of socks. Dickinson was the engineer of the distillery. When the distillery operations grew, he made sure the castle's plumbing system paid for the distillery's expansion.

Going concern
Parker had a good contact with a guard who traded with Parker for fuel. The literature highlights Parker provided van Rood and Dickinson with fuel. The three working together created the synergy for van Rood's going concern. The illegal distillery had a constant stock supply and almost become a monopoly.

Donaldson and Bader
He was also a great friend of Don 'Weasel' Donaldson and Douglas 'Dogsbody' Bader. Sharp witted and to the point, the Canadian, Donaldson had a manner like Groucho Marx. Donaldson was rude to people he liked.  He was meticulous and polite to the people he did not like.  Both independent, Parker and Douglas Bader had a mutual respect for each other as pilots. They often walked around the courtyard chewing the fat, and having a laugh.

Prisoner of war

Dulag Luft
He spent many months in Dulag Luft. He was still at Dulag Luft in May 1941. He was part of the permanent staff in the compound. His role was to brief new prisoners on the finer nuances of captivity.

Two tunnels
In Dulag Luft he dug and planned two tunnels. He dug tunnels with Jimmy Buckley, Peter Butterworth and Great Escaper and X-Organisation founder Roger Bushell.
On 1 June 1941, fourteen permanent staff broke the trust of the German command. They formed part of a group of eighteen escapees that tunneled out of the Dulag Luft compound. The command reacted with intent. A search involving three-thousand police and security personnel found each escapee. Parker was one of the permanent staff involved who dug this tunnel. He missed out on the breakout. The guards had shifted him to Stalag Luft I prior and this inconvenience upset Parker.

Stalag Luft I

Loud speaker compass
Parker and Buckley reunited in Stalag Luft I. Peter Fanshawe, a future great escaper, joined Buckley and Parker in the next escape attempt. Here they all dug the tunnel. They needed compasses. Parker cadged magnets from the camp loudspeaker. He used these magnets to create compasses. He got caught in the tunnel by the guards... The guards then placed him in the cooler for 14 days.

Ghosts

In June 1941, Parker decided the command should presume two inmates had returned home. Parker and Lieutenant Dakeyne became ghosts. They tricked the command to think two men were missing. This had consequence. 

Security staff struck two men off the records. At Appells the two missing ghosts would cover for escapees. The theory was ghosts helped escapers flee with less obstruction. They could flee occupied Europe with no search squad hunting them. Minding his own business, Parker hid in the roof. After six weeks ghosting, the ferrets captured Parker... The guards enforced solitary confinement on Parker.

Snow burrow escape
In January 1942, snow covered Stalag Luft I. Assessing the snow Parker conceptualised another escape. Parker thought about sheep surviving for days whilst flipped inside snow burrows. Thus, Parker believed a snow burrow could hide him until darkness... He theorised if it was dark enough he could climb out of the burrow, cut the wires for a nice escape...

His escape revolved around two rugby matches. On the pitch, players created a burrow... They kicked in snow during a scrum. The next day, on the next match, Parker, via a scrum, placed himself inside the burrow... Next, the players kicked snow over him... They packed Parker inside. To trap heat Parker wore his donated woolens... A white periscope device placed through the snow helped his breathing. He also lay without moving for hours, which lost heat... Finally, when it was dark enough, he crawled out whilst soaking wet... and then sneaked to the wire. 

Cutting the wire was dangerous... Guards had recently shot and killed a POW doing it. He cut the wire. He attracted the attention he dreaded... the guards started shouting.  They ran to where Parker was working. Much to Parker's astonishment, the guards held back gunfire and arrested Parker near the wire. The guards had assessed a mysterious fire — not an escapee... They thought the condensation steaming off Parker was smoke. This miserable day did not end well for Parker... The command placed Parker in solitary confinement. He spent many days in confinement dealing with frostbite.

In January 1942, the RAF promoted Parker to the rank of Flight Lieutenant.

Charlie Piltz
A few days after his release from the cells, Parker attempted another escape. Parker had prepared the escape earlier. 

Charlie Piltz, real name, Karl Piltz, was the main ferret. Escapers thought of Piltz as the most dangerous guard in Stalag Luft I and Stalag Luft III.
He was a passionate anti-Nazi in the 1930s. Over a nine month period in a prison, the Nazis re-educated Piltz. By 1942 he was a devoted Nazi. He always worked around the clock... He even worked off-duty.  He took great pride in sniffing out tunnels. He complimented prisoners on ingenious escape attempts and mocked the poor attempts with glee. Piltz had a nasty criminal mind... as such, he worked on the same wavelengths as an escaper. Piltz was a menace... 

Parker and Piltz shared a visual resemblance. Parker noted the chance to imitate Piltz. Parker acquired a pair of greasy overalls. Piltz carried a torch, following the Piltz shtick, Parker made a dummy torch from Red Cross klim tins.  He knew, once he'd beaten the gate as Piltz, he'd become an Italian worker with a matching ID. He'd then use  a camp made compass and a traced map to travel. 

He executed the gate escape to perfection.... He mimicked the ferret Piltz. He walked through the gates with ease. To the guards he was Piltz on his way home. Outside the gates, Parker headed off to the woods, as planned. Here, Parker was unfortunate... On the way to the woods, Parker walked into his respected adversary — Piltz... Piltz and the guards arrested the brazen Piltz impostor.

Stalag Luft III
In March 1942 Parker was sent to a new built camp... A camp called Stalag Luft III, situated in Sagan, Poland.
 

In the new camp, Jimmy Buckley and Roger Bushell continued the 'X Organisation'. Buckley, not Bushell, was the 'Big X' in March 1942. Parker was a founding member of the organisation.

Planning staff
There were four methods of escape from a compound. You could walk through the gate. You could be transported through the gate. You could climb over or through the wire, or dig a tunnel. In April 1942, the committee requested a role for Planning Staff with experience in the four methods. Parker had experience in many methods of escape. The committee appointed Parker to the role of Planning Officer. 
Parker's role was an agency for the committee. He had to assess escape plans from prisoners. Assess the prisoners aptitude for escaping, assess if the prisoner was serious enough, and inform them of dangers. Parker would look at the details of the escape plan and hammer it in to shape for the head of the committee. He'd then present the case to the head of the committee for approval.

Tunnel attempt and the Vorlager
On arrival Parker, and Flight Lieutenants Casey, Panton and Dickinson, dug a tunnel. The busy ferrets found this tunnel. Desperate to escape, Parker was found in the Vorlager (which contained the German administration area) during another attempt. To punish Parker, the command placed him in the cells.

Hardware store receipt 
In April 1942, Australian RAF pilot Cornish possessed a receipt for a magnet from a Sagan hardware shop. Cornish wanted to contain a problematic guard with the document. The flaky guard had once supplied a magnet... Cornish's fake receipt revealed the guard had signed for a package that carried a magnet. Cornish asked Parker to use his magic for the guard... When asked by Cornish, Parker, on cue, revealed the receipt for viewing. Parker threw this receipt in the air... and the receipt vanished. The guard was ashen faced at the sight of that probative document...

In 1942, Parker become one of the first escapers to flee from Stalag Luft III.

Train hopping
In confinement, during his permitted one hours exercise, Parker, took a key from a door. Parker altered this key... On his next escape attempt, Dickinson in the next cell, distracted the guard. With the guard occupied, Parker opened and shut his cell door with the key. Parker jumped through a window and climbed over the wire.  His escape was opportunistic... He hardarsed it. Parker wore his RAF trousers and a grey sweater, he had no food, and no ID papers. 

Outside of the compound, Parker decided to train hop. This mode of transport required luck. A goods train moving out of Sagan train station was the first hop. He travelled to a shunting yard in Chemnitz, Germany. Parker jumped off the train to hide in the woods. With the darkness of night Parker jumped on another goods train and his carriage travelled to Grünberg. Unsettled by this train journey taking him off direction, Parker stole a bicycle and travelled towards Poland. 

Food was scarce... Parker satiated his hunger pangs in a farmhouse. He stole black bread, and he ate this meal with no harassment. His bicycle journey took him to another yard near Zullichau on the Polish frontier. Here, he decided on another freight hop. The train had travelled along the Warsaw–Kunowice railway towards Warsaw, Poland... Warsaw was a place he could get help from the resistance. As Parker attempted to jump on this train, the station police accosted him. The capture frustrated an exhausted Parker. Parker's long excursion turned circular. The excursion resulted in a return journey to Stalag Luft III, Sagan. In Sagan, the command returned Parker to the same confinement cell.

Scrounging attempt
Parker and his neighbour Dickinson were desperate. Doing a longer time in solitary confinement, the two smuggled in saws... The guards captured both sawing the bars...

Getting the guards onside was, in general, common in 1942. Many guards had political sympathies..., ...coffee was liquid gold. Many would take the coffee or the chocolate. This all concerned the X-Organisation. They felt this could lead to problems if too many escapers scrounge. Later, Buckley and Bushell created a department for this type of deft prisoner-guard interaction. Prisoners like Peter Stevens took over this type of work.
In April and May 1942, Parker was confident he could bribe a guard. In the cells, Parker and Dickinson attempted to bribe a guard for a tool. The guard found this bribe insulting. The guard took umbrage. The command charged them with bribery.

By May 1942, the command got tired of Parker. They regarded Parker as a serial escaper. On 5 May 1942 the command sent him to high security Oflag IV-C (Colditz).

Oflag IV-C

Parker and Dickinson were immediate in their next effort. They joined Harrison, Dick Howe, Lawton and O'Hara in an exploration. They cut an exploratory hole in the roof. The guards found the hole and arrested each explorer red handed.

Locksmith on call
On arrival, Parker learned the lags had a problem. Some locks in the castle had up to twenty-seven tumblers. Parker announced he'd sort that out..  Parker cracked on, and in two weeks he had a key for every castle lock. Don ‘Weasel’ Donaldson, recalled the first lock he picked.  He and his comrades watched Parker lock picking in the attics... The atmosphere had tension, it was like participating in a heist movie... The only piece of equipment Parker had on arrival was a tube of toothpaste. For this lock, he injected the toothpaste after a tumbler moved. Using the toothpaste, Parker broke into his first door in the castle. Within a week Parker, without using toothpaste, could master any lock inside thirty seconds.

Parcel store
Parker's comrades developed distraction strategies. They knew that guards could not focus on more than one thing at a time. They exploited the narrow focus of the human mind. 

Parker and his comrades knew a big object going missing presented a huge problem for any guard. A guard would face disciplinary action in that scenario. Accusations of loafing on duty would stigmatise him. The command may demote the guard from his rank, or discharge him. They estimated the small chances of any guard reporting such a theft.

Ladders
In November 1942, Tunstall faced a court-martial. Assisted by Bader, he had splashed Eggers with a water bomb from a barred window. At this point Black Cambpell had not explained to Tunstall he may face an execution. Looking in to the yard, Tunstall saw an opportunity that soothed his stress. A ladder rested on the wall behind a patrolling guard. Tunstall thought, the attic could make use of that. There was also a potential alternative use, too. It could be a nice festive gift to the Dutch lads who were planning a tunnel. Tunstall called on Dickinson, Donaldson and Parker for help.

In the distraction, Donaldson acted as the decoy. Donaldson sat and rested on the wall in the sight line of the guard. He had an intention of keeping the guards attention. For roughly ten minutes, he performed to his best. He pulled faces, made shapes with his hands, he tried to rub his nose with his foot. A crowd of curious lags turned up. They passed judgement on Donaldson's distress. Donaldson's act amused the guard, like planned. Behind the guard's back, Tunstall and Dickinson removed the ladder from the wall... They carried the ladder up the spiral stair case, nearby. A logistical problem presented itself... The ladder would not fit up the staircase. They also knew Donaldson could not carry this act on for much longer.
Parker grabbed his tools and cut off a four foot section. The ladder disappeared into the ether... No security was called.

Civilian vehicles
In POW camps, many prisoners had not experienced civvy street for some time. A civilian vehicle was rarely seen inside a POW camp. A vehicle in a camp caused curiosity. In 1942, Parker stole tools from a civilian vehicle parked in the court yard. In this theft O'Hara also stole the map out of the glove compartment. This vehicle theft relied on a team distracting the guards. In 1943, these distractions became comfortable. In 1943 a delivery van appeared in the court yard. The van delivered heavy equipment for the barbers. The lags robbed the van. O'Hara stole a Hydraulic jack. The jack was a good tool, and O'Hara went to the top of the list with the escape committee. He also wanted to steal the back wheel... To their own detriment, the delivery lads rushed and flustered... They had their minds on the next job. Looking out for them, O'Hara left a tightened nut in the back wheel... They later speculated the wheel would fall off the car in a country lane. Parker and his comrades planned and executed the stooging system for the robbery.

Locksmith commons
Like Parker, the lock-pick Guigues was a serial escaper... In 1943, the guards shifted Fredo Guigues. The Wehrmacht moved the French officers to Lübeck, though a harassed Guigues would later return to the castle... The alarmed parcel store was above the French quarters.  Guigues had cracked the store. Before leaving, Guigues had a chat with Dick Howe and Parker...  

In 1943 Parker played in the last ever stool ball match. Parker played in the 4-4 draw against the departing French.

Cracking the store
Parcels were important to escapers. The parcels carried escaping aids. All parcels were checked by the censoring department. And beating the censoring department to the contraband, boosted morale. In the summer of 1943, Parker's mechanical skill gave him access to the uncensored parcels.  These heists were tense. The robbery of the store required timing, distractions and strategy... They set up stooging systems involving seventeen lookouts. To keep the guards distracted, the lags arranged chews... These mock punch-ups caused injury. A few POWs ended up with cracked teeth, others ended up in the sick bay with cracked ribs. The lookouts took their positions in the chaos, and Parker, used the lookouts for cues. He opened the doors for Dick Howe, or Doug Crawford. After twenty minutes, he let them out.

Franz Josef escape
The Franz Josef escape attempt occurred on 19 May 1943. Mike Sinclair mimicked a guard who resembled Franz Josef. In the effort, the guards shot Sinclair... Parker and John 'Bosun' Chrisp were central to the escape attempt. Chrisp was the ropeman. Parker, was in charge of the sickward as the signalman. His keys opened up castle doors.

A Colditz ghost
On 28 March 1944 Parker attempted another escape. This escape was with a ghost called Mike Harvey. To the guards, Harvey and Jack Best had left he castle in March 1943... Harvey wanted people to refer to him as Dennis Bartlett from that day onward. Jack Best was Bob Barnes...

Parker and Harvey cut the barred windows on the third floor of the Saalhous in anticipation for this one... The ropeman prepared the rope, the forgery department prepared the fake IDs and Parker manufactured skeleton keys... Parker also had his lock picking tools ready.

Parker had studied the movement of the guards outside the Saalhaus. He noted a building that had the sign Luftschutzraum on it. In General, these shelters had two exits... They believed that more people entered that building than exited it. They opined one exit led to a civilian area. Parker and Harvey also did recce on the patrolling guards... They noted a guard disappeared when he marched around the corner. The guard always left a 20 second window of opportunity...

On the day of the escape attempt, Parker and Harvey, out of sight of the guard, rappelled from the third floor window and made their journey... On their way to the shelter, a sentry heard them... They startled this guard... Reactive, he fired warning shots... Making it worse, he smashed the alarm... Hassled, Parker picked the lock of the shelter door... Inside the shelter, Parker locked the door. Outside of the shelter it swarmed with guards using torches, using flood lights and carrying weapons. The security team rattled the locked door, and left. Parker and Harvey rushed down to the cellar that led to a dead end... Here they realised this escape was over.

Eggers interviewed both escapers.  Parker turned the conversation, 'he was surveying, not escaping'. It was for Eggers's benefit... The one exit shelter dismayed Parker... He could not forgive that regulation breach. Parker contended, Eggers knew what he had done here... The poor bastards... He told Eggers he'll make a safety complaint... Eggers matched Parker's face and sent Parker to a temporary cell in the courtyard.  Eggers smelled a rat with Harvey. His face did not fit the ID photo of Dennis Bartlett... This resulted in suspicion. Eggers also found Jack Best... and this ended the ghosting in Colditz.
Uncovering the ghosting scheme stressed the security team... Excited, they did not search Parker. They left him with his skeleton keys... Parker cut a hole in the wire grill and passed out his greatcoat which contained his prized tools. The guards gave Parker extra confinement for damaging the cell grill.

Great Escape
The Gestapo executed comrades of Parker, after the Great Escape.  These murders, included the murder of Bushell — a comrade Parker had dug tunnells with. Parker involvement in escaping activity was heavy at Stalag Luft III before he was shifted. Parker reflected on 'what could have been'...

Private Murphy liberation
On 15 April 1945, Private Murphy of the US Army liberated the castle.  On the 16 April, three French POWs had ignored instructions and went missing. They had ventured into the countryside. The countryside around Colditz was volatile. 
On the 17 April, Dick Howe, as a senior officer, assessed the POW contingent around town. He made observations around Colditz. He noted Parker and his messmates had split up. Howe spotted Don Donaldson in a villa. Donaldson had a pleasant day. The owners of the building had done well for themselves during the war years. Donaldson, and two others were drinking cups of tea with three blondes. Howe spotted a large Mercedes-Benz touring car. Out of place..., it was driving around the town. Howe noted, Vincent Parker was in the driving seat, and Parker's two business partners, Dickinson and van Rood were his passengers. 
Following the liberation, Parker returned to England for a period of leave. The RAF then posted him to Milfield to qualify on Hawker Tempests.

Personal life
Post war, Parker planned to marry his girlfriend.

Death
On 29 January 1946, Parker tested a plane. Following a slow roll from 5000 ft, his plane, the Tempest V EJ859, crashed. He died near Felkington, Duddo, Northumberland.

Legacy
The RAF buried Parker at 10 am, on 2 February 1946. Parker rests in Harrogate (Stonefall) Cemetery. Colditz comrade Noel Dan Hallifax rests nearby.

Mentioned in dispatches during the Second World War, the Air Ministry gazetted him on 13 June 1946. The city council in Townsvile, Australia named 'Vincent Bushy Parker Park', situated in Rollingstone after him.
In 2003, the City of Thuringowa Council commissioned three murals to place inside his park. The murals paid homage to Parker's life and the amenities block at his park houses them. In 2007, the historian Colin Burgess published a book about Parker.

See also
 Douglas Bader a serial escaper and flying ace.
 Dominic Bruce a seventeen times serial escaper.
 Jimmy Buckley a notable comrade of Parker.
 Roger Bushell Great Escaper and X-Organisation founder. 
 John Chrisp The ropeman of Colditz. Integral to many escape attempts.
 Lieutenant Alan 'Black' Campbell A lawyer whose skills saved lives.
 Leslie George Cole (The Great Lavante) a magician who mentored Parker.
 Damiaen Joan van Doorninck a dutch Colditz escaper, and a lock breaker.
 Reinhold Eggers The security officer of Colditz from November 1940 to April 1945.
 Cecil Hight A comrade of Parker's who died on the day Parker was captured.
 Dick Howe a serial escaper and the head of the escape committee.
 Corran Purdon a St Nazaire Raid commando and a Colditz comrade of Parker.
 Pat Reid an author, and a comrade of Parker.
 Geoffrey D. Stephenson a Colditz comrade of Parker's. 
 Peter Stevens serial escaper and scrounger in Stalag Luft III
 Pete Tunstall a serial escaper and notable goon baiter.

Notes

Footnotes

Sources
Books
 
 
 
 
 
 
 
 
 
 
 
 

Gazettes, journals, newspapers and magazines
 
 
 
 

Websites

External links
 HARROGATE (STONEFALL) CEMETERY (CWGC)
 CWGC foundation

1918 births
1946 deaths
Australian aviators
Australian escapees
Australian magicians
Australian military personnel of World War II
Australian prisoners of war
Australian World War II flying aces
Australian World War II pilots
Aviators killed in aviation accidents or incidents in England
Escapees from German detention
Military personnel from Queensland
People from Queensland
People from Sydney
People from Townsville
Prisoners of war held at Colditz Castle
Royal Air Force airmen
Royal Air Force officers
Royal Air Force pilots of World War II
Shot-down aviators
The Few
World War II prisoners of war held by Germany